Paul Andrew Hutton (born October 23, 1949) is an American cultural historian, author, documentary writer, and television personality. He is also Distinguished Professor of History at the University of New Mexico and the former executive director of Western History Association and past president of Western Writers of America.

Career

Research and literary works
At the University of New Mexico, Hutton helped to gather information about George Armstrong Custer for the readers. The result of Hutton's research was The Custer Reader, a collection of essays, photographs, and fiction regarding Custer and his complex personality. Hutton's 1985 book Phil Sheridan and His Army received many awards for historical writing, including the Ray Allen Billington Award. Other books he has written include: 

 

He has written many other award-winning essays, scripts, and articles. He has done a great deal of work in television documentaries, and was a historical consultant for the films The Missing and "Cowboys and Aliens". Dr Hutton has appeared in, written or narrated over 150 television documentaries on CBS, NBC, PBS, Discover, Disney Channel, TBS, TNN, A&E, and the History Channel. Listed below are recent samples of his work.

Film and television writing credits
 Eighty Acres of Hell (TV) – (writer) (2006)
 Investigating History  TV series –  (unknown episodes) (2003)
 Carson and Cody: The Hunter Heroes (TV) – (writer) (2003)

Hutton also served as the President of the Western Writers of America from 2002 to 2004.

Television producing credits
 Investigating History – TV series (co-producer) (unknown episodes) (2003)
 Carson and Cody: The Hunter Heroes – (2003) (TV) (producer)

Television and film appearances
As self:
 The Real West (A&E) – 60 episodes (1993–2006)
 Biography – Billy the Kid (2006) 
 Biography – The James Gang: Outlaw Brothers (TV episode) (1995) 
 CBS –  Wyatt Earp: Walk with a Legend  (TV)(1994) 
 American Experience: Wyatt Earp (2010) 
 American Experience: Custer's Last Stand  (2012) 
 American Experience: Butch Cassidy & The Sundance Kid  (2014)

As actor:
 Naked Gun : The Final Insult (1991) as Doctor

Hutton made his cameo appearance in the movie Naked Gun 33 (as a doctor at the very end of the film) while he was collaborating with David Zucker on a screenplay about Davy Crockett.

Personal
A native German, adopted by an American Air Force couple, he was reared primarily in England, Texas, Taiwan, and Indiana. Hutton married the former Vicki Bauer on July 25, 1972. They had a daughter. They were divorced August 1984. He then married Lynn Brittner in 1989 and they had two children. They eventually divorced.

He married Tracy Cogdill in 2001 and adopted her two daughters from a previous marriage.

Education
Dr Hutton graduated with a B.A. in History from Indiana University, in 1972, where he also obtained his M.A. (1974) and his Ph.D. in History (1981).

References

External links
 Paul Hutton official site
 Rambles: Paul Andrew Hutton
 
 

1949 births
Living people
German adoptees
German emigrants to the United States
Historians of the United States
Indiana University alumni
University of New Mexico faculty
Writers from Indiana
Writers from New Mexico